Pals of the Golden West  is a 1951 American Western film starring Roy Rogers, Dale Evans and Pinky Lee.

Plot

Cast

External links
 

1951 films
1951 Western (genre) films
American black-and-white films
American Western (genre) films
Films directed by William Witney
1950s English-language films
1950s American films